Lambert Maltock (born 15 May 1956) is a Ni-Vanuatu football administrator who has been the president of the Vanuatu Football Federation since 2008. in 2018, he was appointed acting president of the Oceania Football Confederation, becoming permanent president and a member of the FIFA Council the following year.

References

1956 births
Living people
Football people in Vanuatu
Association football executives
Presidents of OFC